The Folda Bridge is a suspension bridge in Nærøysund municipality in Trøndelag county, Norway. The bridge crosses the Foldereidsundet strait which is part of the inner-Foldafjord. The bridge was completed in 1969.

References

External links
Picture of the Folda Bridge
Another picture of the bridge

Road bridges in Trøndelag
Suspension bridges in Norway
Nærøysund
Norwegian County Road 17